Gaziosmanpaşa is a quarter in Ankara, Turkey, just south of the city center. Several embassies accredited to the Republic of Turkey are situated here.

See also
 Gaziosmanpaşa

References 

Neighbourhoods of Çankaya